Dainavos Futbolo Klubas Dainava, in short, DFK Dainava, is a Lithuanian football club from Alytus. The club was established in 2016 as a phoenix club after FK Dainava Alytus was dissolved in 2014.

History
Modern DFK Dainava was established after "Auska" and "Dzūkų tankai" merged in 2016.

In 2015 FK Auska were playing in the Pirma lyga. In 2016 the Lithuanian Football Federation allowed the club change its name and allowed to play in the Pirma lyga (second tier).

In 2016 they came in 9th place, in 2017 they came in 4th place in the Pirma lyga.

In 2018 season they were runners-up in Pirma lyga. In the Relegation/Promotion play-off match  DFK Dainava lost 0–3 to FK Palanga. On the 3rd of November they lost the second match in Gargždai  0–2.  FK Palanga won 5-0 on aggregate and saved their place in the 2019 A Lyga.

DFK Dainava club sought promotion to the A lyga in 2019 season, but were unable to get sponsorship required for the A Lyga from the municipality of Alytus. As a result the club remained in the Pirma lyga. They have finished 2019 LFF I Lyga in 4th position, and attempted to license to A lyga again in the 2020 season. The application was again declined.

In March, 2021 before the start of football season in Lithuania, DFK Dainava applied for license to be playing in highest tier Lithuanian league A Lyga in 2021 season. Application was declined by Lithuanian Football Federation as club couldn't find solution with stable finance and women's football team. At the time A Lyga had 9 qualified teams who got permits and were able to compete in A Lyga. DFK Dainava application were granted by Lithuanian Football Federation to play and compete in Lithuanians top tier league as a 10th team, as a result DFK Dainava fixed all the issues regarding sponsorship and stable finance. For the first time in DFK Dainava club history since re-creation in 2016, Alytus town yet again will be having a men's football team competing in Lithuanian top tier football league A Lyga. DFK Dainava will start season with -3 points as regulations and laws via Lithuanian Football Federation. First match for DFK Dainava in A Lyga will be played in Marijampole on March 6 against also newly promoted team FK Nevėžis.

On First League 2022 club became the winners and Promoted to 2023 A Lyga.

Recent seasons

Kit evoliution

Stadium

DFK Dainava plays in the Alytus Stadium. It is a multi-use stadium in Alytus, Lithuania. The stadium holds 3,790 people. The stadium was renovated in 2010.

Current squad

Out on loan

Managers
  Ričardas Grigaliūnas (March, 2016 – June, 2016)
  Darius Gvildys (June, 2016 – end of 2017)
  Donatas Vencevičius (January, 2018 – end of 2018)
  Kim Rønningstad (2019)
  Łukasz Hass (2020)
  Fabio Mazzone (August, 2020) 
  Tomas Ražanauskas (April, 2021)
  Matthew Silva (February, 2022 – May 2022)
  Sergey Kuznetsov (May 2022 –)

References

External links
 

Football clubs in Lithuania
Sport in Alytus
Association football clubs established in 2016
1935 establishments in Lithuania
Phoenix clubs (association football)